William Warntz (1922–1988) was an American mathematical geographer based at the Harvard Laboratory for Computer Graphics and Spatial Analysis. He was a "pioneer in mathematical approaches to spatial analysis".

Life
Warntz studied economics at the University of Pennsylvania, gaining a PhD there. His papers are held at Cornell University Library.

Works
 Toward a geography of price; a study in geo-econometrics, 1959
 Geography now and then: some notes on the history of academic geography in the United States, 1964
 Geographers and what they do, 1964
 Macrogeography and income fronts, 1965
 Breakthroughs in geography, 1971

References

External links
 Donald G. Janelle, William Warntz and the Legacy of Spatial Thinking at Harvard University, 2012.

1922 births
1988 deaths
American geographers
Harvard University people
20th-century geographers
University of Pennsylvania alumni